Catherine Ann Whitaker (born 10 February 1986) is a British sports reporter, presenter and commentator for both television and radio, who has covered tennis and other sports for Eurosport, Amazon Prime Video UK, BBC Radio 5 Live, BeIn Sports, Perform and IMG Media. She is also co-presenter of The Tennis Podcast, a weekly podcast launched in 2012.

Education 
Whitaker was educated at Kendrick School in Reading and the University of Nottingham.

Life and career 
Since 2018, Catherine has presented the ATP, WTA and US Open tennis coverage for UK rights-holder Amazon Prime Video. She has also been an on-site presenter for Eurosport at the US Open, Australian Open and French Open tennis tournaments.

Since May 2012, she has co-presented The Tennis Podcast, a weekly downloadable podcast, with daily editions at the Grand Slam tennis tournaments. Her co-presenter is BBC tennis commentator David Law. At Wimbledon, she has reported and commentated for BBC Radio 5 Live and BBC Television.

Prior to that, she was a presenter for Live at Wimbledon, the in-house TV channel produced by IMG Media for the Wimbledon tennis Championships.

Her other roles have included commentating for WTA Media and ATP Tennis Radio, presenting the video content for the Queen’s Club Championships, and she has also presented BeIN Sports’ coverage of the WTA and ATP events in Doha.

In February 2018, she presented Eurosport’s  Winter Olympic Games coverage in Pyeongchang, and voiced the opening and closing ceremonies to the Tokyo Summer Olympics. She has also commentated on Eurosport's figure skating programming, having trained as a figure skater between the ages of 5 and 18.

References

External links 
 Catherine Whitaker website
 The Tennis Podcast

People educated at Kendrick School
Living people
1986 births
Alumni of the University of Nottingham
BBC sports presenters and reporters
English tennis commentators